James Honeyborne is the creative director of Freeborne Media, he previously worked as an executive producer at the BBC Natural History Unit where he oversaw some 35 films, working with multiple co-producers around the world. His projects include the Emmy Award and BAFTA-winning series Blue Planet II, the Emmy Award-nominated series Wild New Zealand with National Geographic (U.S. TV channel), and the BAFTA-winning BBC1 series Big Blue Live with PBS.

Honeyborne conceived Blue Planet II in 2013. It was first broadcast on BBC1 in October 2017.

He spent five years on attachment to John Downer Productions, co-directing the series Supernatural and Weird Nature, before returning to the BBC to make Wildlife on One documentaries with David Attenborough and to work on the strand Natural World (co-produced by Animal Planet and National Geographic Channel).

A keen scuba diver and photographer, he has also made a series of documentaries with world champion freediver, Tanya Streeter.

From 2009 to 2013, he was series producer for Africa the BBC TV series which aired in 2013. In 2019, he signed an overall deal with Netflix.

Early life
Honeyborne attended Ampleforth College and studied biology at the University of Newcastle-upon-Tyne. He graduated in 1992 and joined the BBC Natural History Unit in the same year.

Filmography

Executive producer
Blue Planet II (BBC1 2017)

Mountain: Life at the Extreme (BBC2 2017) – delivered

Wild Alaska Live (BBC1 2017) – Development Exec / Business Winning Exec

New Zealand: Earth's Mythical Islands (BBC2 2016) 
Nominated Best Cinematography, Royal Television Society Craft Awards
Nominated Outstanding Narrator, EMMY – Sam Neill
Nominated Best Natural History Documentary, Grierson Awards
Patagonia: Earth's Secret Paradise (BBC2 2015)

Big Blue Live (BBC1 2015): 
Winner, BAFTA TV Awards, Best Live Event
Nominated Best Science & Natural History Documentary, Royal Television Society Programme Awards
Nominated, Technical Innovation, Wildscreen
Japan: Earth's Enchanted Islands (BBC2 2015):
Nominated Best Science & Natural History Documentary, Royal Television Society Programme Awards
Nominated Best Grading, Royal Television Society Regional Awards, West of England
Winner, Award for Excellence, Guild of TV Cameramen
Alaska: Earth's Frozen Kingdom (BBC2 2015):
Nominated Best Cinematography, Royal Television Society Regional Awards, West of England
Wonders of the Monsoon (BBC2 2014):
Winner, Best Composer, Royal Television Society Regional Awards, West of England
Nominated Best Cinematography, Royal Television Society Regional Awards, West of England
Nominated Best Sound, Royal Television Society Regional Awards, West of England
Winner, Award for Excellence, Guild of Television Cameramen 
Nominated Best Composer, Jackson Hole
Nominated Best Cinematography, Wildscreen
Autumnwatch (BBC2 2014):

24 Hours on Earth (BBC1 2014):
Nominated Best Sound, Royal television Society Regional Awards, West of England

Series producer
Africa (BBC1 2013):
Nominated, Best TV Series, Freesat Awards 
Winner, Best Series Wild Talk Africa 
Winner, Cinematography, Wild Talk Africa
Nominated, Music, Wild Talk Africa
Winner, Best Film, Green Screen Awards
Winner, Best Post-production, Green Screen Awards
Winner, Best Animal Behaviour, Jackson Hole 
Nominated, Conservation Hero, Jackson Hole
Winner, Best Limited Series, Jackson Hole
Nominated, Marian Zunz Newcomer, Jackson Hole
Nominated, Best Cinematography, Jackson Hole
Nominated, Best Editing, Jackson Hole
Winner, Best Documentary, Prix Italia
Bronze Award, APG Creative Strategy Awards
Nominated, Best photography, RTS Craft Awards
Winner, Grand Prize for Documentary (Nature and Environment), International Gold Panda Awards, Sichuan TV Festival 
Winner, Best Long Documentary (Nature and Environment), International Gold Panda Awards, Sichuan TV Festival
Winner Best Wildlife Film, New York Film Festival
Winner, Best in Festival, New York Wild Film Festival
Winner, Cinematography, Royal Television Society Regional Awards, West of England
Winner, Music, Royal Television Society Regional Awards, West of England
Winner, Best Science and Natural History Documentary, Royal Television Society Programme Awards
Nominated, Photography: Factual, British Academy Television Craft Awards
Nominated, Sound: Factual, British Academy Television Craft Awards
Guild of Television Camera Award for Excellence 
Winner, Best Specialist Factual, Televisual Bulldog Awards
Winner, Best Cinematography, Televisual Bulldog Awards

Feature Director
Meerkats the Movie (2007)
Winner, Grand Prix Earth, Tokyo International Film Festival
Best of Festival, Wild Talk Africa Film Festival
Winner, Best Editing, Wild Talk Africa Film Festival
Winner, Best Sound Design, Wild Talk Africa Film Festival
Nomination, Best Music, Wild Talk Africa Film Festival
Nomination, Best Script, Wild Talk Africa Film Festival
Winner, The Silver Teton, Jackson Hole
Nomination, Best Theatrical, Jackson Hole

TV producer
Natural World (BBC2 2006) - Buddha, Bees and the Giant Hornet Queen
Winner Best Programme (over $500,000), IWFF Missoula 
Nominations for cinematography, animal behaviour and music, IWFF Missoula.
Winner, Best People and Nature Award, Japan Wildlife Film Festival
Nomination, Animal Behaviour, Jackson Hole
Winner, Special Jury Prize, Festival de l'Oiseau
Nomination, Parthenon Entertainment Award for Innovation, Wildscreen Festival
Nomination, News & Documentary EMMY for outstanding individual achievement in a craft, cinematography
Dive Galapagos (BBC2 2005)
Winner, Best Presenter, IWFF Missoula
Winner, World Underwater Festival, Antibes
Diving with Whales (BBC2 2005)
Nomination,  News & Documentary EMMY for outstanding individual achievement in a craft, cinematography
Wildlife On One (David Attenborough):
Dragonfly (BBC1 2004)
Nomination at Japan Wildlife Film Festival
Winner at Festival International du Film Ornithologique de Ménigoute
Nomination, Best Editing, Wildscreen
Nomination, Editing, Broadcast Young Talent Award
Peregrine (BBC1 2004)
Nomination at the European Nature Film Festival, Valvert
Winner Best animal behaviour: International Festival de l'Oiseau
Winner Grand Prix du Festival: Festival International du Film Ornithologique de Ménigout
Pelican (BBC1 2001)
Winner Grand Prix du Festival: International Festival de l'Oiseau
Nomination, Best Cinematography, Jackson Hole

John Downer Productions
Weird Nature (BBC1 2002)
Winner RTS Award for Picture enhancement and also Design and Craft Innovation
Winner best animal behaviour and winner best TV series, IWFF Missoula Also 4 craft merit awards
EMMY nominations in Cinematography and Best Direction
Winner Most innovative documentary award and winner Best Nature documentary award, Shanghai Film Festival
Supernatural (BBC1 1999)
Winner RTS Craft Award for Design and Craft Innovation

References

External links

Personal web page

English conservationists
English environmentalists
British television producers
People educated at Ampleforth College
1970 births
Living people